The Convent of the Sisters of Zion is a Roman Catholic convent of the Congregation of Notre-Dame de Sion, located near the eastern end of the Via Dolorosa in the Old City of Jerusalem. The convent was built in 1857 by Marie-Alphonse Ratisbonne. The site includes the Church of Ecce Homo, also known as the Basilica of Ecce Homo, named for Pontius Pilate's Ecce homo speech which is traditionally thought to have taken place on the pavement below the church.

History 
In the first century BC, Herod the Great built a large open-air pool. In the second century, Roman Emperor Hadrian added arched vaulting to enable pavement to be placed over the pool, making it a large cuboid cistern to gather rainwater from guttering on the forum buildings. On the surface, Hadrian built a triple-arched gateway as an entrance to the eastern forum of the Aelia Capitolina in Jerusalem. The northern arch is preserved under the apse of the Basilica of Ecce Homo.

By 1857, Marie-Alphonse Ratisbonne, a French Jew and former atheist who converted to Catholicism and became a priest, decided to purchase the site and start a convent. Between 1858 and 1862, he built a basilica (the Church of Ecce Homo), which overlaps part of the gateway arch. He also built an orphanage for girls and other standard convent buildings. A school for girls has been added with boarders coming from all over the Arab world till 1967. As the convent was confined in size, the nuns bought a few of the surrounding Arab homes and incorporated them into the convent; they soon opened a medical dispensary on the site. Due to the introduction of state support for orphans, by the Ottoman government and later (1948) by the Israeli government, the orphanage buildings have been used for other religious purposes since 1967. The convent now maintains a guesthouse and library.

Beneath the convent is an extensive area of Roman flagstones. As these continue, to a lesser extent, under the Church of the Condemnation, they have been known for several centuries. Due in part to an etching of a game by Roman soldiers discovered in 1864 involving the execution of a "monk king", the flagstones were thought by nuns to be those of Gabbatha, which  describes as the location where Pontius Pilate adjudged Jesus' trial. It is possible that following its destruction the Antonia Fortress's pavement tiles were brought to Hadrian's plaza.

See also 
Aelia Capitolina
Antonia Fortress
Church of the Flagellation
Ecce homo
Gabbatha
Struthion Pool

References

Classical sites in Jerusalem
Ancient sites in Jerusalem
Roman Catholic churches in Jerusalem
1857 establishments in the Ottoman Empire